Marcel Ruiz  is a Puerto Rican actor, known for his roles as Alex Alvarez in the series One Day at a Time and John Smith in the 2019 film Breakthrough.

Career
Ruiz began his career acting in commercials at an early age. He moved to Los Angeles at age nine. Since 2017, Ruiz stars in the reboot of One Day at a Time as the character Alex Alvarez on Netflix (2017-2019), Pop (2020), and CBS (2020) In 2019, he starred in Breakthrough, a drama film and true story, portraying the role of John Smith. He loves playing sports like basketball and soccer.

Ruiz was named as one of the "10 Latinxs to Watch in 2019", by Variety magazine.

Filmography

Awards and nominations

References

External links 
 

Living people
Male actors from Los Angeles
Male actors from San Juan, Puerto Rico
Puerto Rican male film actors
Puerto Rican male television actors
Year of birth missing (living people)
21st-century American male actors